All Night Long is a 1962 British neo noir drama film directed by Basil Dearden, and starring Patrick McGoohan, Marti Stevens, Paul Harris, Keith Michell, Richard Attenborough and Betsy Blair.  The story, by Nel King and Paul Jarrico, writing under the name Peter Achilles, is an updated version of William Shakespeare's Othello, set in the London jazz scene of the 1960s. The action takes place in a single evening, during an anniversary party. The black-and-white film features performances by several prominent British jazz musicians – among them Tubby Hayes and John Dankworth – as well as the Americans Dave Brubeck and Charles Mingus, who were in the UK in 1961 when filming took place and were recruited to participate.

Plot
Musician Aurelius Rex and his wife Delia, a retired singer, are the recipients of a big, one-year wedding anniversary party in London thrown by a wealthy music promoter and jazz aficionado, Rod Hamilton, in a Thames-side warehouse he has remodeled to create a space for the kind of all-night sessions that can't be done in Mayfair. Johnny Cousin, a drummer with aspirations of starting his own band, has promised booking agent Lou Berger that Delia has come out of retirement and will resume performing, not with Rex but with Johnny. On the phone, Berger tells Johnny that Delia's presence is absolutely necessary. Delia tells Johnny in no uncertain terms that she does not intend to resume her career.

Music plays an important role in the film, as party guests take it in turn to join in, and we learn more about all the characters. Johnny begins a series of complex machinations, all designed to make Rex believe that Delia has been having an affair with Cass, the band's manager. Johnny's back-stabbing costs Cass his job, when he plies Cass—a recovered addict—with marijuana.

Johnny records a conversation between Cass and Benny, who are lovers, talks to Cass about how much he loves Benny, and tapes Delia promising Cass that she will get Rex to forgive him. He edits the material to distort the meaning.  Delia's performance of a song, rehearsed solely for the party, furthers Rex's suspicions that she is unhappy at home.

Rex tries to strangle Delia and assaults Cass, sending him over a balcony. In front of the whole party, he accuses them of infidelity. Johnny's long-suffering wife, Emily, asks if he heard this from Johnny, protesting that “Johnny is a liar. He never told the truth in his life.” When Rex mentions the tape, Benny makes Cass admit that he was talking about her on the tape, not Delia. His plot exposed, Johnny runs out of the room. Rex follows and is throttling Johnny when Delia stops him. He walks slowly back to the room where Cass lies injured in Benny's arms. He kneels down, takes Cass's hand and holds it against his cheek. “Don’t worry man, everything is cool.“ Cass says. Rex walks out of the room and Delia runs after him. He looks at the marks of his fingers on her neck, stares at his hand and gently caresses her face. He goes out into the night as the ambulance arrives. Delia runs after him and they stand facing each other.

Cass is loaded into the ambulance and Benny goes with him. Johnny is noodling on the drums. Emily brings him his coat. “I love you,” she says. “Don't you understand, I don't want to be loved…I love nobody. Don't even love Johnny…Go find somebody else to love…” he says. Johnny goes to town on the drums as Emily woodenly walks away. Rod also walks out, leaving Johnny alone, his drumming more and more frantic.

The last shot of the film shows Rex and Delia walking along the embankment his arm around her.

Cast

 Patrick McGoohan as Johnny Cousin
 Marti Stevens as Delia Lane
 Paul Harris as Aurelius Rex
 Keith Michell as Cass
 Richard Attenborough as Rod Hamilton
 Betsy Blair as Emily
 Bernard Braden as Berger
 Harry Towb as Phales
 María Velasco as Benny
 Carol White as Lucille (uncredited)
 Dave Brubeck as himself
 Keith Christie as himself
 Bert Courtley as himself
 John Dankworth as himself
 Ray Dempsey as himself
 Allan Ganley as himself
 Tubby Hayes as himself
 Geoffrey Holder as himself (uncredited)
 Charles Mingus as himself
 Barry Morgan as himself
 Kenny Napper as himself
 Colin Purbrook as himself
 Harry Beckett as himself – trumpet player (uncredited)
 John Scott as himself

Production
Screenwriter Paul Jarrico, who had been blacklisted, used the name Peter Achilles when the film was originally released,  The Writers Guild of America West restored Jarrico's credit for this film and three others in 1998. Betsy Blair, who plays Emily, also fell prey to the House UnAmerican Activities Committee. Gene Kelly, her husband at the time, intervened to get her the part in Marty (1955) for which she earned an Academy Award nomination, but she eventually had to move to Europe to pursue her career.

On the soundtrack, drummer Allan Ganley performs for Patrick McGoohan, who learned to play the drums for the film.

Reception
David Meeker, author of Jazz in the Movies (1982), described the film as a "ludicrous combination of Othello and jazz jamboree that falls flat on both counts". But TCM.com observes:  “The film was unfairly maligned by many British critics who were Shakespeare purists and dismissed (it) as a travesty of the original with a 'happy' ending – sacrilege! – and the added gimmick of featuring such well known jazz artists as Charles Mingus, Dave Brubeck and John Dankworth. Gimmick or not, the movie is worth a look if only for the exhilarating musical numbers and a rare look at Mingus and Brubeck in their only appearance in a dramatic film. Even more compelling is Patrick McGoohan's frenzied, hyperactive performance as the scheming sociopath Johnnie Cousin.”

In his November 11, 1962, “British Film Scene” column in The New York Times, Stephen Watts includes a piece on Patrick McGoohan, “On the Ascendant”, in which he notes that the actor “has been well received here for his appearance as the somewhat neurotic jazz drummer in All Night Long.”

Home media
The film was released in the UK by Network DVD in 2007, and by The Criterion Collection in January 2011. A blu-ray edition was released by Network DVD in 2016.

Original music
Philip Green
Tubby Hayes (additional music "The Chase")
Kenny Napper (additional music "Sax Reference")
John Scott (additional music "Scott-Free")
Dave Brubeck (additional music, a new recording of "It's a Raggy Waltz")
Dave Brubeck and Charles Mingus (improvised composition "Non-Sectarian Blues" [as it is titled on Columbia Records releases])

References

External links

Criterion Collection Essay

1962 films
1962 drama films
Fiction set in the 1960s
British black-and-white films
British drama films
Films about interracial romance
Films based on Othello
Films directed by Basil Dearden
Films set in London
Films shot at Pinewood Studios
Jazz films
1960s English-language films
1960s British films